The Battle of Shantou (a treaty port long romanised as Swatow) occurred in SeptemberOctober 1927 during the first phase of the Chinese Civil War in China.

Battle

Time & place 
From the morning of September30 to the evening of October1, 1927, around Tangkeng Town in the Meizhou-Chaozhou border hills.

Opponents 
A Guangdong warlord force of 15,000 troops allied with the emergent Right-Kuomintang under Chiang Kai-shek, well-entrenched and supplied blocking the march of the Nanchang mutineers, led by Comintern advisors and Communist Party of China members, toward the resupply of Shantou by a Soviet ship with the ultimate aim of seizing Guangzhou for the emergent Left-Kuomintang government then established in Hankou, Hubei.

After the rigours of the two-month Little Long March, there were only 5,000 troops available for this Comintern mission. Ye Ting and He Long had most of the force. Zhu De's section was charged with protecting the march's north flank.

CPC founding member Zhang Tailei arrived from Hong Kong with a new Comintern directive: there would be no arms shipment coming into Shantou. The troops were to avoid combat and retreat into the hills south and west of that port, there to proclaim the Haifeng Soviet.

Outcome 
Left-KMT troops saw 40% of their number killed in action during the two days' of fighting. Ye Ting took his surviving troops to Haifeng where they enforced the return to local power of Peng Pai. He Long had no men at his disposal and barely escaped; Zhu De led his survivors northwest into Hunan, He Long's old bandit-ground.

With Right-KMT-allied warlord troops closing in, CPC leaders Zhou, Li and Zhang slipped out of the now-hopeless Shantou port area and eventually returned to Shanghai, the latter two by way of Hong Kong.

See also
 Swatow Operation

Bibliography 

1927 in China
Conflicts in 1927
Shantou
September 1927 events
October 1927 events
Fengshun County